Hinely Nunatak is a small nunatak, isolated except for Graser Nunatak  to the northeast, located  east of the Sky-Hi Nunataks in Palmer Land, Antarctica. It was named in 1987 by the Advisory Committee on Antarctic Names after John A. Hinely, Jr., a United States Geological Survey (USGS) civil engineer who, with William F. Graser, formed the USGS satellite surveying team at South Pole Station, winter party 1976.

References

Nunataks of Palmer Land